San Pierre is a census-designated place (CDP) in Railroad Township, Starke County, in the U.S. state of Indiana. The population was 144 at the 2010 census.

History

Established and laid out in 1854, the area was originally called Culvertown, although a post office had been established as River in 1853. According to one local tradition, the village later took the name of  San Pierre, named after a nearby French-Canadian saloon owner. The story goes that 'Pierre' built a shack some 400 feet south of the village of Culvertown and began to sell whisky there. As a consequence of this inducement, the town shifted slightly to the south and the name was changed to San Pierre. Another tradition records the village being named after a French railroad worker called 'Pierre', with San being added to provide more importance to the name. In any case, the name was changed simply to Pierre in 1894, possibly as a result of increasing tension between Spain and the United States, leading up to the Spanish–American War. Finally the name was changed back to San Pierre in 1899.

Sandhill Cranes
Due to its closeness to the Jasper-Pulaski Fish and Wildlife Area, each year San Pierre and the surrounding vicinity is briefly home to more than 10,000 of the sandhill crane species of bird during their fall migration. The bird has become so synonymous with the town that it has become an unofficial emblem of the community, including a depiction on the welcome sign.

Geography
San Pierre is located at the junction of U.S. Route 421 and Indiana State Road 10.

Demographics

As of the census of 2000, there were 156 people, 71 households, and 39 families residing in the CDP. The racial makeup of the CDP was 98.72% White, 0.64% Native American, 0.64% from other races. Hispanic or Latino of any race were 0.64% of the population.

There were 71 households, out of which 25.4% had children under the age of 18 living with them, 40.8% were married couples living together, 14.1% had a female householder with no husband present, and 43.7% were non-families. 36.6% of all households were made up of individuals, and 25.4% had someone living alone who was 65 years of age or older. The average household size was 2.20 and the average family size was 2.93.

In the CDP, the population was spread out, with 22.4% under the age of 18, 5.1% from 18 to 24, 23.1% from 25 to 44, 24.4% from 45 to 64, and 25.0% who were 65 years of age or older. The median age was 45 years. For every 100 females, there were 95.0 males. For every 100 females age 18 and over, there were 89.1 males.

The median income for a household in the CDP was $30,500, and the median income for a family was $39,375. Males had a median income of $20,000 versus $18,750 for females. The per capita income for the CDP was $13,552. None of the population or families were below the poverty line.

Education
San Pierre has a public library, a branch of the Starke County Public Library System.

References

Census-designated places in Starke County, Indiana
Census-designated places in Indiana